Gehlberg is a village and a former municipality in Thuringia, Germany. Formerly in the district Ilm-Kreis, it is part of the town Suhl since January 2019.

Twin towns — sister cities
Gehlberg is twinned with:

  Breuna, Germany

References

Former municipalities in Thuringia
Suhl